Enriqueta is a given name. Notable people with the name include:

Ana Enriqueta Terán (born 1918), Venezuelan poet
Enriqueta Augustina Rylands (1843–1908), the founder of the John Rylands Library, Manchester
Enriqueta Basilio (born 1948), Mexican athlete
Enriqueta Jiménez, Mexican film actress and singer of the ranchera genre
Enriqueta Martí (1868–1913), Spanish child murderer, kidnapper and procuress of children
Enriqueta Mayora (born 1921), Mexican Olympic fencer
Enriqueta Pinto, First Lady of Chile and the wife of President Manuel Bulnes